Battle of Sakarya National Historic Park, established on February 8, 2015, is a protected area of national historic significance associated with the Turkish War of Independence comprising the battleground of the Battle of Sakarya in the Greco-Turkish War (1919–22). It is located in the Polatlı and Haymana districts of Ankara Province.

See also
 Commander-in-Chief National Historic Park

References

National parks of Turkey
Tourist attractions in Ankara Province
Polatlı
Haymana, Ankara
2015 establishments in Turkey
Protected areas established in 2015
Sakarya National Historic Park